Somebody on the Phone (a.k.a. Deadly Night Call) is a 1950 short story collection by American crime writer Cornell Woolrich under the pseudonym William Irish. It consists of six short stories.

Story list 
 Johnny on the Spot 
 Deadly Night Call 
 Momentum
 Boy With Body
 Death Sits in the Dentist's Chair
 The Room With Something Wrong

References

1950 short story collections
Works by Cornell Woolrich
American short story collections
Crime short story collections